Kenneth Wayne Harrison (born December 12, 1953) is a former American football wide receiver in the National Football League for the San Francisco 49ers and the Washington Redskins.  He played college football at Southern Methodist University and was drafted in the ninth round of the 1976 NFL Draft.

1953 births
Living people
People from Beaumont, Texas
American football wide receivers
SMU Mustangs football players
San Francisco 49ers players
Washington Redskins players